KAGE (1580 AM) is a radio station licensed to Van Buren, Arkansas, United States, and serving the Fort Smith area. The station is currently owned by Darren Girdner, through licensee G2 Media Group LLC.

History
In October 2017, the then-KHGG switched its FM simulcast from KHGG-FM 103.1 Waldron (which went silent) to FM translator K266BS 101.1 FM Van Buren.

The call letters changed to KAGE on January 1, 2021, after Pharis Broadcasting, Inc. sold KHGG—but not the translator it was using—to Darren Girdner's G2 Media Group, after having upgraded KHGG-FM and changing its frequency to 103.5 MHz.

On May 24, 2021, KAGE changed their format from sports to Texas/Red Dirt country, branded as "Red Dirt 96.7" (the 96.7 in branding is for translator K244FJ 96.7 FM Fort Smith).

References

External links

 Website

AGE (AM)
Radio stations established in 1958
1958 establishments in Arkansas
Van Buren, Arkansas
Country radio stations in the United States